Mill City is a city in Linn and Marion counties in the U.S. state of Oregon on Oregon Route 22. The population was 1,971 at the 2020 census. It is on the North Santiam River, downstream from Detroit Lake.

The Linn County portion of Mill City is part of the Albany–Lebanon Micropolitan Statistical Area, while the Marion County portion is part of the Salem Metropolitan Statistical Area. The City of Mill City contracts through The Linn County Sheriff's Office for local law enforcement, however does have its own Mill City Fire Department and other public works departments.

In September 2020, Mill City suffered extensive damage from the Santiam Fire.

History
The city was incorporated in 1941, and serves as the education hub of the Santiam Canyon. It was named and known for its various lumber mills, including Hammond Lumber Company and Santiam Lumber Company. Mill City is now home to two lumber mills, Frank Lumber Co. and Freres Lumber plant 3.

One of the oldest and well known landmarks in Mill City is the former railroad bridge, now a pedestrian bridge. The Phoenix Column Bridge, built by Phoenix Iron Works, was manufactured in 1888, moved to San Jose, California, then to Lake Oswego, Oregon, then to Mill City and installed in 1919. Abandoned by Southern Pacific Railroad around 1967, it is now a pedestrian and bike bridge. Current restoration efforts are being undertaken by the Save our Bridge Foundation.

In September 2020, the Beachie Creek Fire swept through the town. Mill City suffered heavy damage from the fire.

Media

The Mill City Logue was published by Al and Arlene Van Dahl from 1926 to 1933. In 1931, they started Western Stamp Collector as a supplement to the Logue. It grew so quickly that in 1933, they closed down the Logue and moved to Albany, Oregon. Al Van Dahl died in 1954. Arlene Van Dahl continued publishing the then semi-weekly, national newspaper until 1976 when she sold it to Jackson Newspapers. (Jackson Newspapers was sold to Capital Cities Communications, later Capital Cities/ABC, which dropped the word "Western" from the name and changed it back to weekly. Capital Cities/ABC was sold to Disney Corp. in 1995. Krause Publications of Iola, Wisconsin, bought Van Dahl Publications, then publishing Stamp Collector newspaper and The Stamp Wholesaler magazine, from Disney in 1996. Stamp Collector ceased publication in 2003.)

The Mill City Enterprise was the longest running local newspaper serving the canyon from 1949 through 1998. The Enterprise was owned and operated by George and Norma Long for 30 years from 1968 to their retirement in 1998 at which point the paper was sold and subsequently renamed. The Mill City Enterprise is currently being archived by the University of Oregon. 

From 1998 until 2014, the Mill City Independent Press (formerly known as the Enterprise) covered local news. It was owned by Phil Foster and then by Bill Downer, a former logger and former mayor of Mill City, and his wife Judy Downer.

The area is currently served by The Canyon Weekly, started in 2010 by Karen & Tim Widmer and Michelle Gates.

Geography and climate

Mill City is located at 832 feet above sea level in the Santiam Canyon and considered part of the foothills of the Cascade Range. The looming canyon walls are the most noticeable feature in passing from Highway 22; however, look more like tall hills on the north and south sides of Mill City. Further into town two bridges allow crossing of the North Santiam River.

Mill City is surrounded by forests of evergreen trees. Most notably the Santiam State Forest to the south, forest land is otherwise privately owned, mostly by Weyerhaeuser but also local companies like Frank Lumber and Freres. Douglas fir mostly dominates the forests, but junipers and maple trees are also scattered throughout.

Demographics

2010 census
As of the census of 2010, there were 1,855 people, 681 households, and 475 families residing in the city. The racial makeup of the city was 90.7% White, 0.4% African American, 1.9% Native American, 0.4% Asian, 0.6% Pacific Islander, 2.0% from other races, and 3.9% from two or more races. Hispanic or Latino of any race were 9.2% of the population.

There were 681 households, of which 36.1% had children under the age of 18 living with them, 49.3% were married couples living together, 13.8% had a female householder with no husband present, 6.6% had a male householder with no wife present, and 30.2% were non-families. 22.8% of all households were made up of individuals, and 8.1% had someone living alone who was 65 years of age or older. The average household size was 2.72 and the average family size was 3.14.

The median age in the city was 36.2 years. 27.9% of residents were under the age of 18; 8.2% were between the ages of 18 and 24; 24.2% were from 25 to 44; 26.3% were from 45 to 64, and 13.5% were 65 years of age or older. The gender makeup of the city was 51.8% male and 48.2% female.

2000 census
As of the census of 2000, there were 1,537 people, 565 households, and 422 families residing in the city. The population density was 1,940.4 people per square mile (751.2/km). There were 629 housing units at an average density of 794.1 per square mile (307.4/km). The racial makeup of the city was 86.27% White, 0.26% African American, 2.34% Native American, 0.85% Asian, 0.20% Pacific Islander, 6.70% from other races, and 3.38% from two or more races. Hispanic or Latino of any race were 11.39% of the population.

There were 565 households, out of which 35.6% had children under the age of 18 living with them, 60.0% were married couples living together, 11.0% had a female householder with no husband present, and 25.3% were non-families. 20.4% of all households were made up of individuals, and 8.0% had someone living alone who was 65 years of age or older. The average household size was 2.72 and the average family size was 3.13.

In the city, the population was spread out, with 30.1% under the age of 18, 7.7% from 18 to 24, 26.7% from 25 to 44, 22.2% from 45 to 64, and 13.3% who were 65 years of age or older. The median age was 36 years. For every 100 females, there were 102.2 males. For every 100 females age 18 and over, there were 96.9 males.

The median income for a household in the city was $32,321, and the median income for a family was $36,736. Males had a median income of $30,197 versus $20,625 for females. The per capita income for the city was $14,595. About 10.0% of families and 13.0% of the population were below the poverty line, including 19.9% of those under age 18 and 2.2% of those age 65 or over.

Education
In the early and mid 1900s Mill City was served by Mill City High School which was eventually moved to Santiam High School after its completion in the 1950s. The old high school building was used until the late 1980s as Mill City Middle School but demolished and replaced by a new facility on the same site.

Previous to 2000, Mill City, Gates, Detroit and Idanha were served by separate schools and districts; however, eventually Mill City became the education center for the Santiam Canyon with the closing of Gates Elementary School in 2012.

As of the 2019 school year Mill City and the rest of the Santiam Canyon is home to Santiam Preschool/Early Childhood Center, Santiam Elementary School, Santiam Junior/Senior High School and Oregon Connections Academy. Mill City is served by the Santiam Canyon School District.

Santiam Jr/Sr High School is home to the Santiam Wolverines, mascot for the athletic programs including football, basketball, volleyball, baseball, softball, cross country and track and field. The Wolverines have had recent success in basketball taking the 2016/17 2A State Championships and in football taking second place in 2A in the 2017 and 2018 seasons.

References

External links
 Entry for Mill City in the Oregon Blue Book
 
Mill City. Episode of States of Mind by Oregon Public Broadcasting, made available by the University of Georgia's Brown Media Archive on the American Archive of Public Broadcasting.

Cities in Oregon
Cities in Linn County, Oregon
Cities in Marion County, Oregon
Salem, Oregon metropolitan area
1947 establishments in Oregon